Juana B. Matias is a Dominican-American politician and attorney from the Commonwealth of Massachusetts. A member of the Democratic Party, she served in the Massachusetts House of Representatives from 2017 to 2019.

Biography
Matias was born in the Dominican Republic, and her family moved to the United States when she was five years old. Matias earned her bachelor's degree in political science and criminal justice from the University of Massachusetts Boston and a Juris Doctor from Suffolk University Law School. She worked as an immigration advocate before going to work for her family's construction company, and she was admitted to the Massachusetts bar in June 2016. Matias ran successfully for the 16th Essex seat in the Massachusetts House of Representatives in the 2016 elections, defeating incumbent Marcos Devers by receiving 48.8% of the vote in a three-way race.

Matias was criticized for claiming during her congressional campaign that she had worked as an "immigration attorney" when in fact she had been an "immigration advocate" who had not yet been admitted to the Massachusetts bar. Matias finished in fourth place in the Democratic Party primary.

Matias was appointed to the board of directors of MassINC in January 2019, and became its chief operating officer in March. President Joe Biden appointed Matias to be the regional administrator for the United States Department of Housing and Urban Development for New England.

References

External links

American politicians of Dominican Republic descent
Living people
University of Massachusetts Boston alumni
Suffolk University Law School alumni
Hispanic and Latino American state legislators in Massachusetts
Hispanic and Latino American women in politics
Dominican Republic expatriates in the United States
Democratic Party members of the Massachusetts House of Representatives
Year of birth missing (living people)